Thongchai McIntyre (born Albert Thongchai McIntyre; 8 December 1958) is a Thai  singer and actor. He is also sometimes known as Bird Thongchai, Phi Bird ("elder brother Bird") or simply Bird. He finished high diploma management major from Thonburi Commercial College.

Considered to be Thailand's No.1 superstar, he is one of the most successful singers in Thailand's history, having sold more than 25 million albums. He is best known for his string (Thai pop) and luk thung music. He has also acted in numerous films, on television, musicals, and in commercials. He is of Mon, Scottish and Thai descent.

Early life

McIntyre was born in Bangkok to parents Udom and James McIntyre. He was the youngest of nine siblings, and his life in the slums did not give him much of a head start, thus his childhood was filled with struggle to supplement the income of his family. As a child, he sometimes taught English to other children in the slum in exchange for 5 to 10 baht. Raised in a music-loving family, Bird McIntyre loved to sing and dance, and showcased his talents in school. His father died when Bird was still a child, He then started working as a bank officer.

Career
While still working as a bank officer, he met the famous Thai TV producer "Kai Varayuth" who recognised Bird's talent. Bird débuted in his first TV series with the help of Kai. His most memorable role was that of Captain Kobori in the 1990 television series Khu Kam, a tragic love story about a Japanese soldier (Bird) and a local Thai girl during World War II. He reprised this role in the 1996 film adaptation, Sunset at Chaophraya.

He reached the height of his musical career in the early nineties. Among his best-known songs are Duay Rak Lae Pook Pan, Koo Gud, Sabai Sabai and Kob Jai Jing Jing. His popular singles released recently include luk thung singles Mah Tummai (with Jintara Poonlarp), Fan Ja (with Jintara and Jarin B. (Joey Boy), Nat Myria Benedetti, and Katreeya English), Lao Su Kan Fang, and Yak Tham Kor Tob and Mai Kang Ying Pae from his album "Volume One". In the mid-nineties, he became the first Thai artist to receive an International MTV Award for his performance in Sunset at Chaophraya.

He was featured on CNN and in Variety magazine. An award-winning documentary of his life entitled Crossing Borders, directed by Phanjanit Garnploog, can be seen at St. John's University in New York. In 2010, Bird made his first international tour in Los Angeles and the 50th Anniversary of Lincoln Center in New York.

In late 2007, he released another album entitled "Simply Bird", which features songs such as Chuay Rap Tee and Mee Tae Kid Tueng.

Discography

Albums and singles

TV dramas

 Numtarn Maai (น้ำตาลไหม้)
 Mongkut Fang (มงกุฏฟาง)
 Tayaat khun pooying (ทายาทท่านผู้หญิง)
 Ruk nai sai mok (รักในสายหมอก)
 Muer ruk rao (เมื่อรักร้าว)
 Kamin kup poon (ขมิ้นกับปูน)
 Wong wean hua jai (วงเวียนหัวใจ)
 Baan soi dao (บ้านสอยดาว)
 Plub pleung see chompoo (พลับพลึงสีชมพู)
 Duang fai yai mai song chan (ดวงไฟไยไม่ส่องฉัน)
 Neu Nang (เนื้อนาง)
 Khu Kam (คู่กรรม) as Kobori
 Wan née tee ror koy (วันนี้ที่รอคอย)
 Niramit (นิรมิต)
 Kuam song jum mai hua jai duem (ความทรงจำใหม่ หัวใจเดิม)
 Kol Kimono (กลกิโมโน)

Awards

Covers by other artists 
In 2012, the popular Japanese girl group Berryz Kobo released a song titled "Cha Cha Sing" as a single. The title track is a cover of the song "Row Mah Sing" by Bird Thongchai. The first coupling track "Loving You Too Much" is also a cover of a Bird Thongchai's song, "Too Much So Much Very Much". Both were translated into Japanese. The single debuted at number 6 on the Japanese Oricon weekly singles chart. In 2013, Japanese girl group Berryz Kobo released a single titled "Asian Celebration". The coupling track of the Limited Edition B and Limited Edition D, "I like a Picnic" is a cover of a Bird Thongchai's song, "กอดกัน(Gaud-gun)".

Koo Gud was covered in Chinese by Hong Kong Cantopop band Grasshopper as Club Broken Heart (Chinese: 失戀陣線聯盟), which became a smash hit throughout Asia. It's also covered in Vietnamese as Thất Tình by Vietnamese duo Minh Thuận and Nhật Hào.

Honours

Tongchai has received the following royal decorations in the Honours System of Thailand:
  1991 – Commander (Third Class) of the Most Exalted Order of the White Elephant
  2005 – Silver Medalist (Seventh Class) of the Most Admirable Order of the Direkgunabhorn
  2012 – First Class (Gold Medal) of Red Cross Medal of Appreciation

References

External links

 
  
 

1958 births
Living people
Thongchai McIntyre
Thongchai McIntyre
Thongchai McIntyre
Thongchai McIntyre
Thongchai McIntyre
Thongchai McIntyre
Thongchai McIntyre
Thongchai McIntyre
Thongchai McIntyre